Early presidential elections were held in Turkmenistan on 12 March 2022. The elections were called after incumbent president Gurbanguly Berdimuhamedow announced his intention to resign. 

The Democratic Party, which has ruled the country since independence after the dissolution of the Soviet Union, chose Berdimuhamedow's son Serdar as its candidate. Serdar Berdimuhamedow was subsequently elected with 73% of the vote. However, the elections were seen by many international observers as neither free nor fair.

Background
No prior elections in Turkmenistan have been free and fair and the 2022 elections took place in an authoritarian context. The country has been described as a totalitarian dictatorship under the rule of Saparmurat Niyazov and Gurbanguly Berdimuhamedow. The Democratic Party of Turkmenistan is seen as the only legitimate force, with other parties having been founded after 2012 in order to give the appearance of a multi-party system. All legal parties currently support the government.

In 2012, the constitution was amended to extend the term of presidents from five to seven years and to eliminate the age-limit of 70. This was seen as an effort to allow the incumbent Gurbanguly Berdimuhamedow to stay in office. Despite this, he signaled his resignation just five years into his seven-year term. On 12 February 2022, the Mejlis passed a resolution scheduling the election for 12 March in accordance with article 81 of the constitution. The son of the former president, Serdar Berdimuhamedow, was widely seen as the successor to his father.

Electoral system
The President of Turkmenistan is elected using the two-round system for a seven-year term.  The minimum age for a candidate is 40.

Candidates

Campaign 
The campaign stage began on 21 February. In accordance with Article 51 of the Electoral Code of Turkmenistan, candidates from the moment of their registration have equal rights to speak at pre-election meetings, campaign meetings, and in the media. Bodies of state power and local self-government, officials of institutions, organizations and enterprises are obligated to assist candidates in obtaining the necessary information related to elections.

According to Article 52 of the Electoral Code of Turkmenistan, each candidate for the President of Turkmenistan can have up to three proxies in each etrap and each city with the rights of an etrap. Candidate meetings throughout the territory of Turkmenistan are held with broad participation of the public, representatives of labor collectives of enterprises and organizations, honorary elders and youth.

Conduct
On 28 February 2022, an observer mission from the Commonwealth of Independent States (CIS) arrived in Turkmenistan. Early voting began on 2 March, where a total of 41 polling stations were opened in 30 countries. Turnout to the election was reported at 97%, according to the Central Election Committee.

Results
The Central Election Committee reported on 15 March that Serdar Berdimuhamedow won the election with 72.97% of the vote. University official Hydyr Nunnaýew came in second place with 11.09%. Unlike in prior elections, the preliminary results were not available on the day after the election. Berdimuhamedow received the lowest amount of votes out of any winning candidate in all Turkmen presidential elections.

Reactions 
General Secretary of the Chinese Communist Party Xi Jinping sent a message of congratulations to Serdar Berdimuhamedow after the results were announced. Russian President Vladimir Putin reportedly extended his congratulations in a phone call with both Gurbanguly and Serdar Berdimuhamedow. The Organization of Turkic States congratulated him via Twitter.

References

Turkmenistan
Presidential election
Presidential elections in Turkmenistan
Turkmenistan